Senator Farrington may refer to:

Frank G. Farrington (1872–1933), Maine State Senate
James Farrington (1791–1859), New Hampshire State Senate